KeepSolid VPN Unlimited is a personal virtual private network software product available for iOS, macOS, Android, Windows, and Linux.

VPN Unlimited is developed by KeepSolid Inc, an American company with headquarters in New York City, the United States. Founded in 2013 in New York, KeepSolid provides cybersecurity software.

VPN Unlimited has 500 servers about 80 locations around the world and operates under the jurisdiction of the United States.

History
KeepSolid was established in 2013 as a software development company and launched VPN Unlimited on iOS with two servers.

In May 2016, VPN Unlimited received the Editor's Choice Award by PCMag.

In November 2018, VPN Unlimited released a lite version of freemium apps for Android and iOS.

In 2019, VPN Unlimited added an open-source WireGuard protocol to the list of available VPN protocols, in addition to IKEv2 and OpenVPN.

As of 2021, VPN Unlimited operates 500 servers in more than 80 locations worldwide.

Technology
VPN Unlimited has desktop applications for Windows, macOS, and Linux, and mobile apps for iOS and Android. The app is also available as an extension for Mozilla Firefox, Opera, Edge, and Google Chrome browsers.

VPN Unlimited supports protocols such as IKEv2, L2TP, OpenVPN, PPTP, and a proprietary protocol called KeepSolid Wise. 

The technology routes the VPN traffic via TCP 443 and UDP 33434 ports, which makes the traffic harder to detect and block.

Additional features 
Besides general-use VPN servers, the provider offers servers for specific purposes, including personal VPN servers, P2P sharing, and torrenting. Some additional features include, kill switch which disconnects the connection in case of any failure and privacy feature like no-log policy.

VPN Unlimited offers four subscription plans: monthly, yearly, tri-yearly, and lifetime.

Servers 
KeepSolid VPN Unlimited maintains over 500 servers in more than 80 locations in different countries, including Australia, Austria, Belgium, Bulgaria, Brazil, Canada, Cyprus, Denmark, Finland, France, Germany, Hong Kong, Iceland, Ireland, Isle of Man, Israel, Italy, Japan, Mexico, the Netherlands, Romania, Singapore, South Africa, Sweden, Switzerland, Turkey, the United Kingdom, and the United States.

VPN Unlimited provides servers for streaming and torrents.

Reception 
According to TechRadar review in 2021: "KeepSolid offers excellent performance for a fair price and apps that run on almost everything". TechRadar says the service has "relatively few servers" but has "excellent WireGuard performance" and "very fast email support".

In a 2021 review, PCWorld called it "A useful app with minimal options".

Other products
 MonoDefense: It is a bundle of security apps, including the full-featured versions of VPN Unlimited, Passwarden, DNS Firewall, and SmartDNS.
 Passwarden: A password manager to keep passwords and other personal information in one location, locked with a master password.
 SmartDNS by KeepSolid: A service that gives access to regionally blocked websites and prevents speed drops while browsing the web.
 DNS Firewall by KeepSolid: network security.
 Goals by KeepSolid: An online and offline tool to manage projects, set goals, collaborate with teams, and assign tasks.
 Private Browser by KeepSolid: A browser for smartphones (both iOS and Android-based), which employs a VPN technology to encrypt users' traffic.

References

Virtual private network services
Software companies established in 2013